Time Line is a solo album by American guitarist Ralph Towner recorded in 2005 and released on the ECM label.

Reception 

Allmusic awarded the album 4 star with the review by Thom Jurek, stating, "this is a brief but utterly captivating issue from one of the music's great composers and theorists that should not be missed by anyone interested in Towner, of course, but also in melodic improvisation and composition". The Penguin Jazz Guide said, "Time Line is a supremely professional record, mostly done in miniatures which couldn't be improved by so much as a note."

Track listing 
All compositions by Ralph Towner except where noted
 "The Pendant" - 4:11   
 "Oleander Etude" - 1:59   
 "Always By Your Side" - 2:52   
 "The Hollows" - 3:23   
 "Anniversary Song" - 1:53   
 "If" - 4:38   
 "Five Glimpses I" - 1:01   
 "Five Glimpses II" - 0:47   
 "Five Glimpses III" - 0:50   
 "Five Glimpses IV" - 0:49   
 "Five Glimpses V" - 0:25   
 "The Lizards of Eraclea" - 2:38   
 "Turning of the Leaves" - 3:45   
 "Come Rain or Come Shine" (Harold Arlen) - 4:14   
 "Freeze Frame" - 4:54   
 "My Man's Gone Now" (George Gershwin, Ira Gershwin) - 5:27  
Recorded in September 2005

Personnel 
 Ralph Towner — classical guitar, 12-string guitar

References 

2006 albums
Albums produced by Manfred Eicher
ECM Records albums
Ralph Towner albums
Instrumental albums